The Lying Days is the debut novel of Nobel winning South African novelist, Nadine Gordimer. It was published in 1953 in London by Victor Gollancz and New York by Simon & Schuster. It is Gordimer's third published book, following two collections of short stories, Face to Face (1949), and The Soft Voice of the Serpent (1952). The novel is semi-autobiographical, with the main character coming from a small mining town in Africa similar to Gordimer's own childhood. The novel is also a bildungsroman "about waking up from the naivete of a small colonial town."

Reception
Reviews of The Lying Days in 1953 were generally positive. New York Times critic James Stern compared the novel favourably to the works of Alan Paton, especially Cry, the Beloved Country, describing The Lying Days as the better of the two novels. Stern described the novel as less "novel" and more "biography", following the style and form of biographical writing. In a review in the Fitchburg Sentinel, W. G. Rogers wrote that in The Lying Days Gordimer shows that South Africa "is a land not of a single problem, race, but of many problems which that one central issue seems to magnify and intensify." Rogers complimented Gordimer on the way she "brings her characters so surely to life", and on how she "writes so moving of love".

Writing in the El Paso Herald-Post, F. A. Ehmann called The Lying Days "not a bad novel", adding that once it got going, Gordimer's characters become "interesting", the plot "satisfactory", and her prose "good [and] honest". But Ehmann was critical of her "experimental prose" at the beginning, saying that "this maladroit display of implied symbolism, disjointed reverie and rhetorical questions is both unnecessary and badly disjointed." In a review in the Petersburg Progress Index, Joan Pollack described The Lying Days as "alive, bright and inquiring" and complimented it on its "handling ... the problems of youth [while] still maintaining the beauty and adventure of life." Pollack said Gordimer "is an expert craftsman and her sensitive ability to portray the most delicate emotions should place her among the most promising newcomers today".

References

Further reading

Reviews

Scholarly criticism

1953 novels
1953 debut novels
20th-century South African novels
Novels by Nadine Gordimer
Apartheid novels